Amblyseius changbaiensis is a species of mite in the family Phytoseiidae.

References

changbaiensis
Articles created by Qbugbot
Animals described in 1987